Apis mellifera sossimai (common name the Ukrainian honey bee) extending from the west of Ukraine centrally and southwards towards the Caucasus mountains. However in 2011 research from Russia conducted mtDNA analysis showing that the A. m. sossimai was not a separate subspecies, but only an ecotype of the Apis mellifera macedonica subspecies.

Its name is derived from St. Sossima, patron Saint of beekeeping in Ukraine. St. Sossima may be a Christian version of the bee-god Zosim of some early pagan tribes of Russia.

References 

mellifera sossimai
Western honey bee breeds